"Auschwitz" is a song composed by Francesco Guccini , and performed by Equipe 84. Although the song was written by Guccini it was credited to Lunero and Maurizio Vandelli as the author was not a member of the SIAE. 
The following year the song was recorded by Francesco Guccini and included in the LP Folk beat n. 1, with the title La canzone del bambino nel vento (Auschwitz) (The song of the child in the wind).

Inspiration and content
Guccini had the inspiration to address the holocaust theme following the reading of the essay by Edward Russell, 2nd Baron Russell of Liverpool The Scourge of the swastika: A Short History of Nazi War Crimes (Also translated into Italian in 1955) and from the autobiographical novel by Vincenzo Pappalettera  Tu passerai per il camino where he had recounted his memoirs about his stay in the Mauthausen concentration camp.

The text is narrated by two voices: the protagonist, a child who in the Auschwitz concentration camp "died with another hundred, passed through a chimney and is now in the wind". The second item is that of the author who poses some rhetoric questions to which there is no answer.

Track listing
7" single – SRL 10-438  
 "Bang bang" – an Italian cover of "Bang Bang (My Baby Shot Me Down)" (Sonny Bono – Alessandro Colombini and Miki Del Prete) – 2:25
 "Auschwitz" (F. Guccini) – 3:47

Covers 
 1992, i Nomadi, nell'album Ma che film la vita
 1994, Rod MacDonald English version with the title Auschwitz (Bambino nel Vento) in the album Man on the Ledge
 1997: Gian Pieretti (album Caro Bob Dylan...)
 2003, Alice, in the album Viaggio in Italia
 2005, Modena City Ramblers nell'album Appunti partigiani
 2013, 7grani, nell'album Neve diventeremo
 Other interpreters
Tazenda

References

 

1966 singles
Italian songs
1966 songs
Songs about the Holocaust
Anti-war songs
Francesco Guccini songs
Ricordi Dischi singles